Brofaromine (proposed brand name Consonar) is a reversible inhibitor of monoamine oxidase A (RIMA) discovered by Ciba-Geigy. The compound was primarily researched in the treatment of depression and anxiety but its development was dropped before it was brought to market.

Brofaromine also acts as a serotonin reuptake inhibitor, and its dual pharmacologic effects offered promise in the treatment of a wide spectrum of depressed patients while producing less severe anticholinergic side effects in comparison with older standard drugs like the tricyclic antidepressants.

Pharmacology
Brofaromine is a reversible inhibitor of monoamine oxidase A (RIMA, a type of monoamine oxidase inhibitor (MAOI)) and acts on epinephrine (adrenaline), norepinephrine (noradrenaline), serotonin, and dopamine. Unlike standard MAOIs, possible side effects do not include cardiovascular complications (hypertension) with encephalopathy, liver toxicity or hyperthermia.

See also 
Moclobemide

References

Abandoned drugs
Antidepressants
Anxiolytics
Monoamine oxidase inhibitors
Reversible inhibitors of MAO-A
Hydroquinone ethers
Bromoarenes
Benzofuran ethers at the benzene ring
4-Piperidinyl compounds
Serotonin reuptake inhibitors